Wellesley High School is a public high school in Wellesley, Massachusetts, United States, educating students on grades 9 through 12.  The principal is Jamie Chisum, who took the position in 2014 after the departure of Andrew Keough. As of 2022, the school serves 1420 students. In 2022 it was ranked the 32nd best high school in Massachusetts and the 785th best public high school in the nation by U.S. News & World Report.

History and current state
The old school building of what was then named Gamaliel Bradford High School was originally built as a public works project in 1938 during the Great Depression, designed by Perry Shaw and Hepburn and built by M. Spinelli and Sons Co., Inc. The building has been modified with several additions throughout its existence, most recently with a new fitness center. The 1938 building was replaced in 2012 with a new building constructed in the former parking lot.

Renewal and expansion

The increasing size of the student body as well as the evolving nature of education challenged the capability of the 1938 building to meet the needs of the school community effectively and safely. In September 2005, the exploration of options for a new building or refurbishment was commenced by the town.

In October 2007, a public meeting was held to introduce several options for the expansion of the school, including renovation and extension of the existing building and its demolition and replacement by a completely new structure. The site was expanded by purchase of three adjacent properties in Seaver Street and transfer of publicly owned land.

On December 10, 2008, town voters approved the project by a nearly 2 to 1 ratio (5,026 YES to 2,869 NO), to build a new, state-of-the art high school on the parking lot next to the existing buildings.  Site clearance started in August 2009 with the relocation of one house to a nearby site. Construction began March 2010 with an estimated completion date of September 2013. The new facility opened in February 2012, and the school held a gala to say goodbye to the old building, and alumni such as Billy Squier, Jane Curtin, and Biz Stone gave last rites in the school auditorium over a series of weekend concerts and get-together events in 2011.

After much analysis, the existing structure was declared to be a good example of the Art Deco style of architecture; however, it was found by the American Institute of Architects (A.I.A.) not to be a historically significant example and was demolished in 2011 and 2012. The state authorities held the final say in this ruling, but the A.I.A. review opened the door for the eventual knock-down and the final site plotting.  The new structure, which opened to students in February 2012, incorporates some of the design features of the prior building and is limited in its visual impact to blend with the surrounding residential neighborhood. The total cost was estimated to be $130 million with $85 million of that total to be raised from State and Federal matching funds. However, the final project came in under budget at $90 million and opened 18 months ahead of schedule.

Governing bodies
 Students: Student Congress
 Teachers: Faculty Senate
 Administrative: ATM
 Legislative: School Council
 Co-Moderator (Principal), Co-Moderator (Student)
 For next year School Council has been changed to have eleven members: two teachers, four students, and three parents, a community member, and the Principal.
 Two student representatives are elected in Student Congress, another is the president of Student Congress, and another is appointed.
 District Wide: School Committee
 Representatives to Greater Boston Regional Advisory Council to the Massachusetts Board of Elementary and Secondary Education

Extracurricular activities
Wellesley High School offers many after school clubs that are mostly run by students. Notable clubs include Student Congress, Academic Decathlon, the active Debate Club, Drama Society, the Key Club, Model UN, the Science Olympiad Team, the Math Team, the Climate Action Club, MVP Club and the many other cultural and humanitarian-focused clubs.

Drama Society
The Wellesley High School Drama Society produces four productions every academic year a fall musical, winter show (for non-competitive entry into METG), and two spring productions. There are a variety of opportunities for students as they can either audition to be a cast member or work backstage on the stage crew.

Student Congress
This club serves as the primary representative of the student body.  Open to membership from all grades, Student Congress serves to promote the students' interests and enhance their experiences through communication, dialogue, and policy debate. The club also organizes the annual Seminar Day, which allows teachers, students, and guests to run hour-long seminars about their personal experiences, lessons, and interesting topics.

Model UN
The Wellesley High School Model UN club is an after school club formed in 2010.

Academic Decathlon
Wellesley High School has an Academic Decathlon team. The team consistently makes it to the State Finals and has placed in the top 3 in Massachusetts for the past several seasons. In 2015, the team lost to the Acton-Boxborough High School for the state title.

Athletics

Wellesley High School is a member of the Bay State Conference and the Eastern Massachusetts Division of the Massachusetts Interscholastic Athletic Association (MIAA). A wide variety of sports are offered at Wellesley High School at the varsity, junior varsity, and freshmen levels. More than 70% of WHS students participate in sports at some point during their time at Wellesley High.

State championships

In 2006, the Wellesley High School girls' ice hockey team won the state championship.
In 2006, the Wellesley High School boys' lacrosse team won the Division 2 All State Championship.
On March 15, 2008, the Wellesley High School girls' varsity basketball team defeated Millbury at the DCU Center in Worcester to win the State Basketball Championship.
In June 2010, the Wellesley High School boys' tennis team defeated St. John's 5–0 to win its first ever Division 1 State Championship.
In 2013, the Wellesley High School girls' tennis team defeated Notre Dame Academy to win the state championships.
On June 10, 2016, the Wellesley High School girls' tennis team won the Division I State Championships.On November 19, 2016, Wellesley High School boys' cross country team, coached by former Olympian Tim Broe, won the Division I State Championships.

In 2021, the Coed Sailing team won their division in the MassBay Sailing League (MBL) and went on to come in first in the Team Racing Championships and the Fleet Race Championships.  In 2022, the team won the Mass HS State Championship regatta to become the State Champions.

Varsity Sports in Wellesley for the 2014–2015 academic school year are as follows:

 
 Fall
 Football
 Boys' Soccer
 Girls' Soccer
 Field Hockey
 Boys' Cross Country
 Girls' Cross Country
 Girls' Volleyball
 Girls' Swimming
 Girls' Diving
 Boys' Golf
 Winter
 Boys' Basketball
 Girls' Basketball
 Boys' Indoor Track 
 Girls' Indoor Track
 Boys' Ice Hockey
 Girls' Ice Hockey
 Boys' Swimming 
 Boys' Diving
 Dance Team
 Boys' and Girls' Alpine and Nordic Ski Team
 Wrestling
 Girls' Gymnastics
 Spring
 Softball
 Baseball
 Boys' Outdoor Track and Field
 Girls' Outdoor Track and Field
 Boys' Tennis
 Girls' Tennis
 Boys' Lacrosse
 Girls' Lacrosse
 Boys' Volleyball
 Sailing Team
 Girls' Golf

Co-curricular offerings

Performing arts
Wellesley High School is widely known for its performing arts department, which has reached state and national levels on a consistent basis. Some of the most notable works by the Wellesley High School performing arts department include the Keynote and Rice Street singer's involvement with the Boston Pops, as well as the band and orchestra programs.

Band
 1 o'Clock Jazz Band – Winner of many different medals at the International Association for Jazz Education.
 2 o'Clock Jazz Band – The 2 o'clock Jazz Band was a finalist at the Essentially Ellington Jazz Band Competition and Festival in New York City for the second year in a row. The group has been accepted as a finalist again in 2009 for the third time. They were also accepted in 2011, their fourth time. They won first place at the 41st Annual Berklee Jazz Festival in 2009, their second consecutive victory there. They won again in 2014. They have won a gold medal at the MAJE state finals for each year since 2002.
 Concert Band
 Wind Ensemble – Since the origin of the WHS Wind Ensemble, it has won the gold medal at the MICCA state finals several consecutive years, and has performed at both Mechanics Hall in Worcester and Symphony Hall in Boston.
Orchestra (strings)
 The orchestra won a gold medal at MICCA in 2009 and performed at Symphony Hall in March.
 The Honors Chamber Orchestra won a gold medal at MICCA for many consecutive years and performed both in Mechanics Hall, Worcester and Symphony Hall, Boston.
Choral Program
Concert Choir - Wellesley High School's unauditioned 
Keynote Singers - Select Ensemble of 50 singers who are known for their beautiful, engaging, and energetic arrangements. They appeared at the "Boston Pops: Home Alone In Concert" in 2013 and 2018 alongside the Rice Street Singers and the Boston Pops Orchestra, conducted by Keith Lockhart.
Rice Street - Select Ensemble of 21 singers who are known for their jazz arrangements. They have won numerous awards alongside the Keynote Singers at the all state level. They appeared at the "Boston Pops: Home Alone In Concert" in 2013 and 2018 alongside the Keynote Singers and the Boston Pops Orchestra, conducted by Keith Lockhart.
Song Sisters - The all treble choir that specializes in more modern music
Brooks Brothers - the TB choir that specializes in fun pop music
 Drama Program
 Four levels of acting classes are offered.
 The Wellesley High School Drama Society has won the Massachusetts High School Drama Guild Festival and advanced to New Englands five times in the past ten years. Their most recent win was in 2010 with their production of the self-scripted Blüdpayne VII: A Fistful of Blüdpayne. In 2007, Wellesley won with their production of Dark of the Moon, and in 2006, with the self-scripted Der Waffle Haus, Ergo Leggo My Ego.
 Technical Theatre
 Stagecraft and Stagecraft Intensive classes are offered.

Journalism
The Bradford is the Wellesley High School newspaper. The Journalism class is responsible for publishing new issues. Red Ink is an arts and literary magazine with student submitted poetry, stories, photography, and otherwise. The Green Pages is a digital newsletter, published bimonthly by students, focusing on the "green happenings" of the Wellesley Public Schools.

Associated programs

Child Lab
Child Lab is a developmentally appropriate laboratory preschool for 3, 4, and 5 year olds located on the ground floor of Wellesley High School. Since its inception in 1979, the Lab School has enrolled 18 children each year. It is an elective in which high school students enroll to learn about the development of young children and the best ways to approach optimum learning for the children. Child Lab is a great opportunity for high school students to learn about different ages and stages of children as well as to have the children taught by the students who have taken an interest in early childhood development.

Partnership with Wellesley College
Students at WHS may take classes at Wellesley College without paying tuition, provided that the classes are not offered at WHS.

Notable alumni

 David H. Locke, 1945, politician and lawyer
 Sylvia Plath, 1950, poet
Shaun Fitzmaurice, c. 1960, former MLB baseball player
 Rock Perdoni, c. 1966, former professional football player
 Billy Squier, 1968, musician
 Richard Preston, 1972, novelist 
R. Nicholas Burns, 1974, diplomat 
Damon Santostefano, 1977, film director
David Grinspoon, 1977, astrobiologist and author
 Stephen Burns, 1978, musician
 Phil Laak, 1982, professional poker player
 Katie Redford, 1986, lawyer and activist
 Joe Hurd, 1987, lawyer and venture capitalist
 Greg Yaitanes, 1988, film director
 Adam Haslett, 1988, author
 Derek B. Miller, 1988, novelist
 Jay Harrington, 1989, actor
 Michaela Watkins, 1990, comedian
 Biz Stone, 1992, entrepreneur, co-founder of Twitter
 Aneesh Raman, 1997, political advisor and former CNN war correspondent
Alex Spiro, 2001, trial lawyer
 Michelle Chamuel, 2004, singer
 Christopher Leggett, film producer
 Nate Freiman, 2005, MLB baseball player
 Blake Dietrick, 2011, WNBA basketball player
 Michael Thorbjornsen, 2020, amateur golfer
 Blake Lothian, 2021, NASCAR driver

References

External links
 Official Wellesley Public Schools Web Site
 Official Wellesley High School Website
 The Bradford, Official School Newspaper
 Red Ink Magazine, Official School Literary Arts Magazine

Wellesley, Massachusetts
Schools in Norfolk County, Massachusetts
Public high schools in Massachusetts
Bay State Conference